The 1997 Mid-American Conference baseball tournament took place in May 1997. The top four regular season finishers met in the double-elimination tournament held at Trautwein Field on the campus of Ohio University in Athens, Ohio. This was the ninth Mid-American Conference postseason tournament to determine a champion. Top seeded  won their first tournament championship to earn the conference's automatic bid to the 1997 NCAA Division I baseball tournament.

Seeding and format 
The top four finishers based on conference winning percentage only, participated in the tournament. The teams played double-elimination tournament. This was the final year of the four team format, as the field expanded to six teams in 1998.

Results

All-Tournament Team 
The following players were named to the All-Tournament Team.

Most Valuable Player 
Bart Leahy won the Tournament Most Valuable Player award. Leahy played for Ohio.

References 

Tournament
Mid-American Conference Baseball Tournament
Mid-American Conference baseball tournament
Mid-American Conference baseball tournament